Levante may refer to:

People
 Levante (singer), Italian pop singer-songwriter
 LeVante Bellamy (born 1996), American football player

Places
 Levante, Spain, the eastern Iberian coastal region of Spain
 Riviera di Levante, an Italian name for the Italian Riviera
 Sestri Levante, an Italian town

Sports
 Levante FC, a former Spanish football club
 Levante UD, a Spanish football club

Transportation
 Levante Ferries, a Greek ferry company
 Caetano Levante, a Portuguese wheelchair-accessible coach
 Maserati Levante, an Italian mid-size luxury SUV
 Suzuki Vitara, a Japanese subcompact SUV also sold as the Mazda Proceed Levante

Other uses
 Levante (hosiery), an Italian marketer and manufacturer of hosiery
 Levante-EMV, a newspaper from the Valencian Community, Spain

See also
 Levant, region in the eastern Mediterranean, variously defined.
 Levant (disambiguation)
 Levanter (disambiguation)
 Levantine (disambiguation)